Events in the year 2023 in Paraguay.

Incumbents
 President: Mario Abdo Benítez 
 Vice President: Hugo Velázquez Moreno

Events 

23 April: 2023 Paraguayan general election

Deaths 

 22 January - Darío Jara Saguier, 92, footballer (Rubio Ñu, Cerro Porteño, national team).

References 

 
Paraguay
Paraguay
2020s in Paraguay
Years of the 21st century in Paraguay